An Evening in Rivendell is the first album by the Danish group The Tolkien Ensemble. It features songs composed to the lyrics found in J. R. R. Tolkien's The Lord of the Rings and forms the first part of what was to become a complete musical interpretation of all lyrics in the book.

Track listing

Reception 

Af Søren Aabyen, reviewing the album for the Danish Tolkien Association, found that rarely had any music appealed to him as much. He was delighted by the mezzo-soprano Signe Asmussen's mellow rendering of "Galadriel's Song of Eldamar". He enjoyed the playful hobbit-song "There is an Inn, a merry old Inn", and Caspar Reiff's suitably melancholy guitar for "The Old Walking Song" alongside the rich baritone voice of Mads Thiemann and the lyrical violin of Mette Tjærby. Aabyen noted also the pleasure of finding Queen Margaret of Denmark's illustrations in the accompanying booklet. Anthony Burdge and Jessica Burke, in The J. R. R. Tolkien Encyclopedia, note that the album was the first of four by the ensemble, complete with the queen's illustrations "greatly admired by Tolkien."

The Tolkien Ensemble called their Danish reviews "outstanding", noting that in other countries Tolkien Online had described it as "the most beautiful presentation of the poems of The Lord of the Rings", while Classic CD named it "Highly persuasive and splendidly performed".

Credits

 Peter Hall – vocal, guitar, harmonica, penny-whistle, Frodo, Sam and Tom Bombadil
  – guitar
 Morten Ryelund Sørensen – violin
  – Accordion
 Morten Ernst Lassen – Aragorn
 Signe Asmussen – Galadriel and Ent-wife
 Mads Thiemann – Bilbo and Ent
 Ole Jegindø Norup – Gildor
 Melene Nordtorp – Goldberry
 Torben H. S. Svendsen – double-bass
 Peter Halaburt – oboe
 Jesper Korneliussen – Vibraphone, Marimba, bells and chimes
 Mette Tjærby – violin
 Anne Eltard – folk-violin
 Tom McEwan – percussion, spoons and dishes
 Maria Boelskov – harp
 Michael Friis – bass
 Berit Johanson – piano
 Nina Reintoft – cello
 The Commotio quartet: Morten Ryelund Sørensen, Mette Tjærby, Jørgen Eyvind Hansen and Nina Reintoft
 Male choir: Steffen Bruun, Johnny Johansen, Anders Holte, Björn Tengstrand, Frank Sylvan, Morten Clausen, Jacob Ægidius, Morten Ryelund Sørensen, Torben Eskildsen and Caspar Reiff

Production

 Musical Direction: Morten Ryelund Sørensen
 Production: Caspar Reiff, Peter Hall and Morten Ryelund Sørensen
 Engineering: Hans Nielsen and Saqib
 Cover Illustration: Queen Margrethe II of Denmark
 Cover Design: Dan Eggers and Connie B. Berentzen

References 

The Tolkien Ensemble albums
1997 debut albums
Concept albums